This is a list of years in Mauritius.

20th century

21st century

 
History of Mauritius
Mauritius-related lists
Mauritius